Richards-Gebaur Memorial Airport is a former airport that operated alongside Richards-Gebaur Air Reserve Station (also Richards-Gebaur Air Force Station) until the base's closure in 1994, and until it was closed in 1999. Formerly, it was operated as Grandview Airport from 1941 until it was leased by the United States Army in 1944.

History

World War II
The City of Kansas City built Grandview Airport (IATA code GVW) in 1941.  During World War II, the United States Army Air Forces I Troop Carrier Command built a facility on part of the airfield in 1944 which was used as a sub-base for Sedalia AAF (later Whiteman Air Force Base) for overflow traffic and training uses.  The United States Navy also used the airport as an Outlying Landing Field (OLF) to Naval Air Station Olathe, Kansas where aviators were trained for carrier operations. The airport remained the property of Kansas City, Missouri.

During the 1950s
As a result of the Cold War military buildup, Grandview Airport was leased by the United States Air Force on 1 January 1952 and title was transferred to the Federal Government in November 1952.  After some construction and upgrading of facilities, Grandview Air Force Base was opened on 1 October 1952, with the 4610th Air Base Squadron being the base operating unit (operating from Fairfax Field in Kansas City, Kansas). No military personnel were assigned prior to 1954 while major construction took place on runways, taxiways, aprons and support facilities.

Beneficial occupancy of Grandview AFB began on 16 February 1954 when the 4676th Air Defense Group (ADG) was moved by Air Defense Command to the new base from Fairfax Field.   The 4676th ADG's mission included the management of the station facilities, commanding the Air Base squadron, Material and Supply squadrons, Infirmary and other support units.  Shortly afterwards, in March 1954 the first operational flying unit, the 326th Fighter-Interceptor Squadron (FIS), was activated and assigned to the group. The squadron was equipped with F-86D Sabre interceptors.   The 326th FIS upgraded to the F-102 Delta Dagger in 1957, and inactivated on 2 January 1967.  Also in March 1954, the ADC Central Air Defense Force (CADF), a command and control organization established its headquarters at Grandview AFB, and the 20th Air Division activated its headquarters on 8 October. 

Early in 1955, additional units were stationed at Grandview.  The 326th FIS came under the command of the 328th Fighter Group, (later the 328th Fighter Wing) which replaced the 4676th as host organization and controlled the interceptor squadrons at the base until inactivating in July 1968.  The 71st Fighter-Interceptor Squadron arrived January 1967 from Selfridge AFB, Michigan with the F-106 Delta Dart, also inactivating in July 1968.

After a Federal Aviation Agency (FAA) memo in the early 1950s declared that the city's Kansas City Downtown Airport was the most unsafe major airport in the country, the city government built terminals and runways. north of the city at the new Mid-Continent Airport, which opened in 1956 and was later renamed Kansas City International Airport (retaining its original aviation code MCI). The airfield and other facilities at Richards-Gebaur were returned to the City of Kansas City, Missouri, in 1985.

Between 1983 and 1997 the city of Kansas City lost $18 million operating Richards-Gebaur Memorial Airport and in 1998, the Federal Aviation Administration approved a plan to close the airport.  In 2001 the 8th U.S. Circuit Court of Appeals upheld the decision to close the airport in a suit brought by Friends of Richards-Gebaur Airport of Grandview, Missouri.

Post-airport history

Civil
The former airport is now used as the Kansas City SmartPort for Kansas City Southern Railroad to ship cargo to and from Mexico.  Several businesses, in major agreement with the City of Kansas City and the State of Missouri, are removing the old runway and facilities and building a large truck-to-rail freight center, with above-ground and underground storage.  The CenterPoint-Kansas City Southern Intermodal Center will cover  of rail and industrial space.  Phase I of the project will include  of covered industrial warehouses and distribution centers.  Developer CenterPoint Properties of Chicago bought the property from the Port Authority of Kansas City, which still owns  and with Hunt Midwest Enterprises, Inc., will mine limestone and create underground storage spaces.  Major transportation companies include Kansas City Southern railway and Schneider National, Inc., a truck line.  Kansas City Southern's main line runs from the intermodal center at Richards-Gebaur all the way to a deep-sea Pacific port at Lázaro Cárdenas, Mexico.  The first phase is expected to cost $250M and when complete will be able to handle up to 250,000 shipping containers per year.

Military
The former military buildings and flightline facilities at Richards-Gebaur are now essentially abandoned, left in a deteriorating state. Most of the former buildings, including the Officers' and NCOs' Clubs, the base hospital, theater, and commissary, the Wing Headquarters buildings, and some of the base housing have been demolished. Around 2010, the former alert hangars and pads were demolished, along with the east–west runway, to provide space for roadworks providing access to the intermodal facility and the new National Nuclear Security Administration facility that was under construction to the north of the former base.
	 
Many of the previous Air Defense Command structures remain intact, (including the SAGE block-house, the control tower, and some hangars. Some buildings that had been used by the 442nd Civil Engineering Squadron buildings were reconstructed for civilian use, while others, including the base gymnasium, library, bowling alley, personnel office and law enforcement buildings, and some other offices and dorms that were acquired for use by the Calvary Bible College. The base's original swimming pool has been filled in and is now an open field.

References

Buildings and structures in Kansas City, Missouri
Defunct airports in Missouri